Frank George Pelzman (November 13, 1934 – June 29, 2006) is the former Mayor of Woodbridge Township, New Jersey.  A long time member of the township council, Pelzman became mayor in 2002, after Jim McGreevey resigned to become Governor of New Jersey.  Pelzman was elected by the Township Council in January 2002 to serve until the November 2002 special election for mayor, which he won.  He was elected to a full four-year term as mayor in 2003.  He died of cancer in June 2006, a month after being diagnosed. Since he was a supporter of outdoor youth recreation, a park was dedicated in his name on October 19, 2006.

References

External links

1934 births
2006 deaths
Mayors of Woodbridge Township, New Jersey
20th-century American politicians